Tang Dan (born 11 September 1975) is a film director from mainland China who studied in Germany.

Biography

Early life and education 
Tang Dan was born 11 September 1975 in Chengdu, Sichuan. She graduated from the Sichuan Fine Arts Institute in 1998, having studied art and painting. In 1997–1998 she was an exchange student at Kunsthochschule Kassel. In 2000 Tang went to the University of Wuppertal to study communication design with a specialization in photo and film. In 2001–2002 she was a guest student at Deutsche Film- und Fernsehakademie Berlin. She was admitted to the Konrad Wolf Film University of Babelsberg in 2003, where her teachers included the influential gay rights activist Rosa von Praunheim. She completed a master's degree in film directing at Konrad Wolf in 2007.

Filmography 
 2005 Make Love in Heaven, script and direction, 25:30 min. Student film about the first sexual experience of a girl who wants to become an artist.
 2006 The Autumn for Guoguo, starring Boru Ren and Yi Guo
 2008 Dream Team, a family drama where a football coach turns to coaching tug-of-war to primary school kids.
 2009 Feathered Fan and Silken Ribbon, written and directed by Wieland Schulz-Keil and Tang Dan, and edited by Volker Schaner. A documentary about classical Peking opera in modern Beijing.
 2011 I Phone You  a romantic comedy co-written with Wolfgang Kohlhaase and starring Florian Lukas and Jiang Yiyan.
 2012 The Secret Garden, a romantic comedy starring Wallace Chung and Weiwei Tan

External links

References

Chinese film directors
Chinese women film directors
Han Chinese people
Writers from Chengdu
Screenwriters from Sichuan
Chinese women screenwriters
Sichuan Fine Arts Institute alumni
1975 births
Living people